Spinoliva is a monotypic genus of flowering plants belonging to the family Asteraceae. The only species is Spinoliva ilicifolia.

The species is found in Chile.

References

Asteraceae
Monotypic Asteraceae genera